Phanerolepida is a genus of sea snails, marine gastropod mollusks in the family Turbinidae, the turban snails.

Species
Species within the genus Phanerolepida include:
 † Phanerolepida expansilabrum Kuroda, 1931
 † Phanerolepida rehderi MacNeil, 1960
 † Phanerolepida oregonensis Hickman, 1972
 Phanerolepida transenna (Watson, 1879)

References

 Carole S. Hickman, Review of the Bathyal Gastropod Genus Phanerolepida (Homalopomatidae) and a Description of a New Species from the Oregon Oligocene; The Veliger v.15 (1972-1973)

External links
 To World Register of Marine Species

 
Turbinidae